Spence is a locality located within the Naracoorte Lucindale Council in the Limestone Coast region of South Australia. It comprises approximately the southern half of the Hundred of Spence.

References

Limestone Coast